A fess is a heraldic charge.

Fess or FESS may also refer to:

People 

 Simeon D. Fess (1861-1936), American politician and educator, congressman and senator from Ohio
 Fess Parker (1924-2010), American actor 
 Professor Longhair (1918-1980), blues singer and pianist also known as "Fess"
 Fess, nickname of Charlie Johnson (bandleader) (1891-1959), American jazz bandleader and pianist
 Fess Williams (1894-1975), American jazz musician

Other uses 

 Functional endoscopic sinus surgery, also brandname of a simple saline solution for sinus irrigation
 Fess Hotel, Madison, Wisconsin, on the National Register of Historic Places
 Fess Ferenc, a fictional character from Brian Lumley's Necroscope (series) novels
 FESS, an Open Source Enterprise Search Server based on Elasticsearch
 FESS, Flywheel Energy Storage System (cf Flywheel_energy_storage#Pulse_power)